Cecropterus lyciades, the hoary edge, is a species of skipper in the family Hesperiidae which can be seen throughout the eastern United States in open woodlands, deciduous mixed forest and sandy areas. Achalarus lyacides is an uncommon butterfly that is named after an underlying whitish patch on the hindwing patch.

Description
The wingspan of the hoary edge is 4.5 to 4.9 cm. This butterfly is very similar in appearance to Epargyreus clarus but is smaller and has a longer strip of diffused silver on its wing.

Life cycle
There are two broods each year in April and September.

Larval foods
Tickseed
Fabaceae
Legumes

References

Jinhui Shen, Qian Cong, Dominika Borek, Zbyszek Otwinowski and Nick V. Grishin*, “Complete Genome of Achalarus lyciades, The First Representative of the Eudaminae Subfamily of Skippers”, Current Genomics (2017) 18: 366.

Butterflies of North America
Butterflies described in 1832
Hesperiidae